P v S and Cornwall County Council was a landmark case of the European Court of Justice (ECJ) which extended the scope of sex equality to discrimination against transsexuals.

The case concerned a United Kingdom (UK) trans woman, referred to as P in court proceedings, who was dismissed from her post after informing her employers that she was undergoing gender reassignment. She took her employers to an Employment Tribunal. The Tribunal agreed that she had been dismissed because of her gender reassignment, but was unable to rule that she had been discriminated against because at that time the Sex Discrimination Act (SDA) offered little protection to transsexual people. If P had been a trans man, he would have been treated in the same way and so there were no grounds in the SDA to rule that P had been discriminated against. However, the UK was part of the European Community and thus obliged to implement the Equal Treatment Directive. The Tribunal felt the scope of the Directive was wider than that of the SDA and accordingly asked the ECJ for a preliminary ruling. Effectively, the Tribunal asked the Court to rule whether the Directive precluded dismissal of a transsexual for a reason related to his or her gender reassignment.

The Court, assisted by an influential opinion from Advocate General Tesauro, ruled that the Directive was an expression of a fundamental principle of equality and thus that the Directive did indeed preclude dismissal for a reason related to gender reassignment. The Tribunal was able to rule in P's favour and P received compensation from her employers.

It was the first piece of case law, anywhere in the world, which prevents discrimination in employment or vocational education because someone is transsexual. The scope of the ruling is considered as applying to transsexuals "intending to undergo, undergoing or [who] have undergone gender reassignment". However, the Court left open the question of employment where the natal sex or its continuity was a constitutive element in the employee's job. In UK law this is reflected in the Equality Act 2010 where transsexuals can be barred from gender-specific services if that is "a proportionate means of achieving a legitimate aim".

Facts and Procedure 
P was a male to female transgender woman who worked as a senior manager in an educational establishment maintained by Cornwall County Council. She started her employment as a man on 1 April 1991. In April 1992, she informed S, Chief Executive of the establishment, that she intended to undergo gender reassignment. She explained to S that she was to undertake a "life test", an initial period of a year living as a woman. That summer P took sick leave for initial surgery. At the beginning of September 1992, she was given three months notice of dismissal. She was not allowed to return to work as a woman. Final surgery took place before the notice of dismissal had expired. On 3 March 1993, P brought an action before Truro Employment Tribunal, complaining that she had been discriminated against on the grounds of sex. Both S and Cornwall County Council maintained the termination was due to redundancy.

The Tribunal determined that although there was redundancy within P's establishment, the sole and exclusive reason for her dismissal was her gender reassignment. The Tribunal found this situation was not covered by the Sex Discrimination Act. However, article 1(1) of the Equal Treatment Directive states that the purpose of the Directive is to put into effect the principle of equal treatment for men and women, while article 2(1) of the Directive provides that the principle of equal treatment means that there is to be "no discrimination whatsoever on grounds of sex, either directly or indirectly". Moreover, recital 3 in the preamble to the Directive asserts that equal treatment for men and women constitutes one of the objectives of the European Community. The Tribunal considered the scope of the Directive could thus possibly extend to the protection of transsexuals and decided to stay proceedings and refer that interpretation of the Directive to the European Court of Justice. The Court responded in its judgment of 30 April 1996.

Advocate General's opinion 
The opinion of the Advocate General is distinct from the judgment of the Court and has an advisory character. In an influential opinion, Advocate General Tesauro stressed the need for the law to keep pace with the times.

Judgment 
The Court ruled that the Equal Treatment Directive was an expression of a fundamental principle of equality and that the Directive precluded dismissal for a reason related to gender reassignment. 

The Court noted that Article 2(2) of the Directive, relating to occupations where the sex of the worker was a determining factor, could be used to justify such a dismissal, but that there was no evidence this was so in P's case.

Commentary 
 Catherine Barnard considers the judgment important both for its broad approach to the principle of equality and for recognising both the moral and economic significance of the principle. She discusses the potential of the judgment as well as the barriers to implementing its potential.
 Eva Brems sets the judgment in the context of the national legislation of many European countries and the case law of the European Court of Human Rights of the time, which showed a moral consensus for maximum legal recognition of transsexuals, for example in the matter of marriage law and of privacy issues in relation to recording the natal sex on birth certificates.  
 Chalmers et al. note that P v S, along with Defrenne v Sabena, were amongst the first ECJ cases to acknowledge that the principle of equal treatment set out in Article 157 of the Treaty on the Functioning of the European Union (TFEU) enshrines a fundamental right. They discuss KB v National Health Service Pensions Agency, where the Court left it the UK national courts to determine whether a transsexual could rely on his rights under Article 157 in a matter relating to assigning survivor's pension rights. They note that the Court's reluctance to fully engage with the complexities of gender identity is matched by the relatively timid revision at recital 3 of the  Equal Treatment Directive (2006), which refers only to discrimination arising from gender reassignment.

See also 

 Press for Change
 List of LGBT-related cases before international courts and quasi-judicial bodies

Notes

References and sources 
References

Sources

 
 
 
 
 
 
 
 

Further reading

External links 
 Press for Change

Court of Justice of the European Union case law
1996 in case law
1996 in the European Union
European Union labour case law
Transgender case law in the United Kingdom
United Kingdom LGBT rights case law
United Kingdom equality case law
1996 in LGBT history